Lasku Kalayeh (also Romanized as Laskū Kalāyeh and Leskū Kelāyeh) is a village in Kiashahr Rural District, Kiashahr District, Astaneh-ye Ashrafiyeh County, Gilan Province, Iran. At the 2006 census, its population was 1,943, in 640 families.

References 

Populated places in Astaneh-ye Ashrafiyeh County